Zhang Wangli (born 27 May 1996) is a Chinese weightlifter, and World Champion competing in the 69 kg category until 2018, and the 71 kg and 76 kg categories starting in 2018 after the International Weightlifting Federation reorganized the categories.

Career
She participated at the 2018 World Weightlifting Championships in the 71 kg weight class, winning a gold medal. She set four world records in the event, and has the current world record in the clean & jerk and total for the 71 kg category.

Major results

References

External links
 
 

1996 births
Living people
Chinese female weightlifters
World Weightlifting Championships medalists
21st-century Chinese women